A 1982 Broadway stage performance of Alice in Wonderland was telecast on  PBS's Great Performances in 1983. Directed by Kirk Browning, it was produced by PBS affiliate WNET in New York. Black-and-white papier-mâché costumes aimed to re-create the book's original artwork by John Tenniel.

The production was not recorded on film, but on videotape. It starred Kate Burton as Alice, and her father, Richard Burton, as the White Knight. Other notable roles included Nathan Lane as the Mouse, Geoffrey Holder as the Cheshire Cat, Andre De Shields as Tweedledum, and Eve Arden as the Queen of Hearts.

The production was a revival of actress-director Eva Le Gallienne and Florida Friebus's famous 1932 stage adaptation of Lewis Carroll's novel. It had been presented on Broadway in  1982 with Ms. Burton in the lead, but with an otherwise different cast featuring the Mirror Repertory Company. The videotaping was not made in a theatre with a live audience, but in a television studio, much as the 1960 version of Peter Pan had been years before.

The Le Gallienne-Friebus adaptation had previously served as the unofficial basis for the all-star 1933 Paramount Pictures film version of the novel, which featured Charlotte Henry as Alice. The stage production was successfully revived on Broadway in 1947 with Bambi Linn in the title role, and an abridged 6-record 78-RPM album featuring the revival's cast was made by RCA Victor.

The 1983 TV adaptation of the stage production was not the first. It had previously been telecast in 1955 by NBC, as part of the Hallmark Hall of Fame.

Cast
 Kate Burton as Alice
 Austin Pendleton as White Rabbit
 Nathan Lane as Mouse
 Fritz Weaver as Caterpillar
 Kaye Ballard as Duchess
 Geoffrey Holder as Cheshire Cat
 Andre Gregory as Mad Hatter
 Željko Ivanek as March Hare
 Eve Arden as Queen of Hearts
 James Coco as King of Hearts
 Tony Cummings as Knave of Hearts
 Swen Swenson as Gryphon
 Donald O'Connor as Mock Turtle
 Colleen Dewhurst as Red Queen
 Andre De Shields as Tweedledum
 Alan Weeks as Tweedledee
 Maureen Stapleton as White Queen
 Richard Woods as Humpty Dumpty
 Richard Burton as White Knight
 Dean Badolato
 Bill Badolato
 Mercedes Ellington
 David Gold
 Frantz Hall
 Dirk Lumbard
 Robert Meadows
 Kirby Tepper
 S. Addis Williams
 William Connelly

References

Films based on Alice in Wonderland
American television films
1983 television films
1983 films
Films directed by Kirk Browning